Poe Returning to Boston is a statue of American author Edgar Allan Poe in Boston, Massachusetts. It was created by the American sculptor Stefanie Rocknak. The statue is located at the corner of Boylston and Charles streets at Edgar Allan Poe Square.

The statue depicts Poe walking, facing away from the Boston Common. His figure is accompanied by an oversized flying raven; his suitcase lid has fallen open, leaving a "paper trail" of literary works embedded in the sidewalk behind him. The public unveiling on October 5, 2014, was attended by former United States Poet Laureate Robert Pinsky.

References

2014 establishments in Massachusetts
2014 sculptures
Allegorical sculptures in the United States
Boston Common
Bronze sculptures in Massachusetts
Outdoor sculptures in Boston
Edgar Allan Poe
Statues in Boston
Statues of writers